The Roman Catholic Diocese of Saskatoon (erected 9 June 1933 when the Diocese of Prince-Albert-Saskatoon was split) is a suffragan of the Archdiocese of Regina. The current bishop is Mark Hagemoen, following the appointment of the former diocesan bishop Donald Bolen as Archbishop of Regina by Pope Francis on July 11, 2016 . The Roman Catholic Diocese of Saskatoon is located in Saskatchewan, a civil province on the Canadian Prairies.

Bishops

Ordinaries
Gerald C. Murray, C.SS.R. (1934–1944), appointed Coadjutor Archbishop of Winnipeg
Philip Francis Pocock (1944–1951), appointed Coadjutor Archbishop of Winnipeg
Francis Joseph Klein (1952–1967) appointed Bishop of Calgary
James Patrick Mahoney (1967–1995)
James Vernon Weisgerber (1996–2000), appointed Archbishop of Winnipeg, Manitoba
Albert LeGatt (2001–2009), appointed Archbishop of Saint-Boniface
Donald Bolen (2010–2016), appointed Archbishop of Regina (had been Vicar General there)
Mark Hagemoen (2017–Present)

Other priest of this diocese who became bishop
 Murray Chatlain, appointed Coadjutor Bishop of Mackenzie-Fort Smith, Northwest Territories in 2007

Territorial gains

References

Bibliography

External links
Roman Catholic Diocese of Saskatoon site

Saskatoon
Christian organizations established in 1933
Roman Catholic dioceses and prelatures established in the 20th century
Organizations based in Saskatoon
1933 establishments in Saskatchewan